Michael is a 2011 Indian  psychological thriller film directed by Ribhu Dasgupta and produced by Anurag Kashyap.

Plot
The film opens some years ago with Kolkata police inspector Michael at a political rally. It is a large rally, several hundred people packed into a square, the largest protest against the current government, yet it is wholly peaceful. Michael receives a radio order to open fire and disperse the crowd. He protests, it is a peaceful rally, but his supervisor, acting on political pressure from above, repeats the order to fire. Michael fires a single shot that accidentally hits a 12-year-old boy.

Michael is diagnosed with "progressive myopia" and subsequently fired from his position without severance or pension benefits. He begins receiving angry phone calls from the father of the dead boy. The father threatens to kill Michael's 8-year-old son Roy on his 12th birthday.

A couple of years later Michael is living in a small apartment with his son. He makes a miserable living as a projectionist in a movie theater and ekes out some additional income pirating movies for a gang of local thugs. Michael is always harangued by his landlord, the drunk and bitter Mr. DCosta, and continues to receive progressively more threatening calls from the dead boy's father. His only goal is to get his son out of the city and into a boarding school. Rwitika, his only friend, occasionally looks after Roy and urges Michael to pick up and move on. The landlord DCosta frequently bullies and browbeats Michael for overdue rent. Michael is saving furiously to send Roy away and moves the money about his apartment so DCosta cannot find it. Amid this turmoil he finds a quiet comfort in Mrs DCosta who generally sympathizes with him and occasionally warns him if DCosta is about to go on the warpath.

A few days before Roy's 12th birthday Michael gets intensely threatening phone calls. He stumbles out of his movie theater (and forgets an important movie copying job for which he has received an advance). His midget assistant Makkhan copies the movie and tries to sell it to a rival gang. Michael returns later and picks up a DVD (empty, since Makkhan took the movie DVD) and delivers it. When Michael returns home he finds his money gone and the gang boys outside who beat him up until he figures out what happened. His assistant Makkhan shows up, badly beaten up, and discloses that the rival gang members took the DVD and beat him up and gave him no money. If Michael had paid him more money he would not have gone to the other gang. They argue about the money until Michael discovers that his money is gone! Michael, slowly unspooling into insanity, moves Roy to Rwitika's place and subsequently beseeches her to send him away. He barges into DCosta's flat, across the hall, to see them celebrating something. In a maddened (and drunk) stupor Michael threatens DCosta with a pistol and later begs him to return the money. DCosta, himself drunk, curses and berates Michael whereupon Michael, crazed with anger, shoots DCosta dead! His wife reveals that it was she who took the money for her fertility treatment. Michael is shocked and hurt that she betrayed his trust. He runs out of the flat and, knowing that the police will hunt him down for murder, goes to get Roy out of the city.

Michael hurries to Rwitika's place to get Roy. It is midnight, Roy's birthday. Michael runs across a crossroad. A public phone rings, Michael stops to pick it up, it is the dead boy's father, he will shoot Roy! Michael begs him to stop ... Rwitika comes on the line next! Michael hangs up the phone and steps into the road when a passing taxicab runs him over and kills him. It is revealed that Michael had been hearing voices all along (there was no father of the dead boy) and his guilt over the boy at the rally slowly drove him insane. The film ends as a police jeep finds his body and calls for an ambulance.

Cast
 Naseeruddin Shah as Michael
 Mahie Gill as Rwitika
 Sabyasachi Chakrabarty
 Rudranil Ghosh
 Iravati Harshe
 Churni Ganguly

References

External links
 
 Variety review

2011 films
2010s psychological drama films
2011 psychological thriller films
2010s Hindi-language films
Indian psychological drama films
Indian psychological thriller films
2011 directorial debut films
2011 drama films
Films directed by Ribhu Dasgupta